Victor Rosa (born 11 August 1986) is a Brazilian male artistic gymnast, representing his nation at international competitions.  He participated at world championships, including the 2007 World Artistic Gymnastics Championships in Stuttgart, Germany.

Palmares
 , Pan American Games, Team competition, 14 July 2007, Rio de Janeiro

References

1986 births
Living people
Brazilian male artistic gymnasts
Place of birth missing (living people)
Gymnasts at the 2007 Pan American Games
Pan American Games medalists in gymnastics
Pan American Games silver medalists for Brazil
South American Games gold medalists for Brazil
South American Games bronze medalists for Brazil
South American Games medalists in gymnastics
Competitors at the 2002 South American Games
Competitors at the 2006 South American Games
Competitors at the 2010 South American Games
Medalists at the 2007 Pan American Games
21st-century Brazilian people